The 2009–10 season was the inaugural season of North Queensland Fury. It began on 1 May 2009 and concluded on 30 April 2010, with competitive matches played in the A-League between August and February. The club finished the 2009–10 A-League in seventh place, with eight wins, eight draws and eleven losses, narrowly missing qualification for the finals series.

The Fury signed former Scottish international Ian Ferguson to be their inaugural manager, while former Liverpool and England forward Robbie Fowler was the team's marquee player.

A slow start to the A-League season saw the team fail to win any of its first five games, and record only one win in their first eleven matches. The Fury's form improved in the second half of the season, winning seven of their remaining sixteen games.

27 players represented the club in the A-League and there were 10 different goalscorers. The team's top scorer was Fowler, who scored 9 goals in 26 games.

Backgrounds

Transfers

In

Out

Loans in

Players

First team squad

 * Injury replacement player for Scott Wilson.
 ** Injury replacement player for Shane Stefanutto.
 *** Injury replacement player for James Robinson.

Matches

Pre-season friendlies

2009-10 Hyundai A-League fixtures

Player statistics
The Fury used a total of 27 players during the 2009–10 season and there were 10 different goalscorers. There were also two squad members who did not make a first-team appearance in the campaign. Fowler featured in 26 matches – the most of any Fury player in the campaign, only missing one game.

The team scored a total of 29 goals. The highest scorer was Fowler, with 9 goals, followed by Daal who scored 5 goals. Two Fury players were sent off during the season: Kohler and Talay.

Key

No. = Squad number

Pos = Playing position

Nat. = Nationality

Apps = Appearances

GK = Goalkeeper

DF = Defender

MF = Midfielder

FW = Forward

 = Yellow cards

 = Red cards

Numbers in parentheses denote appearances as substitute. Players with name struck through and marked  left the club during the playing season.

References 

Northern Fury FC seasons
North Queensland Fury Season, 2009-10